Sethubandhanam is a 1974 Indian Malayalam-language film, directed by J. Sasikumar and produced by R. Somanathan. The film stars Prem Nazir, Sukumari, Jayabharathi and Adoor Bhasi in the lead roles. The film has musical score by G. Devarajan. It is a remake of Tamil movie Kuzhandaiyum Deivamum, which itself was based on the 1961 film The Parent Trap - both based on the Erich Kästner's 1949 German novel Lisa and Lottie.

Cast 

Prem Nazir as Gopinath
Sukumari as Parvathi
Jayabharathi as Latha
Adoor Bhasi as Unnithan
Prema as Schoolteacher
Baby Sumathi as Saritha, Kavitha (double role)
Bahadoor as Sasi
Meena as Parukutty
Sadhana as Susheela
Anandavally as Gracy
Muthukulam Raghavan Pillai as Vakkeel
TS Muthaiah as Muthalali

Soundtrack 
The music was composed by G. Devarajan and the lyrics were written by Sreekumaran Thampi.

References

External links 
 

1974 films
1970s Malayalam-language films
Malayalam remakes of Tamil films
Films directed by J. Sasikumar